Joseph Mutungi is an Anglican bishop: he has served as the Bishop of Makueni and Machakos in the Province of Kenya.

References

21st-century Anglican bishops of the Anglican Church of Kenya
Anglican bishops of Makueni
Living people
Year of birth missing (living people)
Anglican bishops of Machakos